Joseph Edward Pease, 3rd Baron Gainford (25 December 1921 – 4 April 2013) was a British hereditary peer and a member of the Pease family.

He was the eldest son of Joseph Pease, 2nd Baron Gainford and his wife Veronica Margaret Noble. He was educated at Eton College, Gordonstoun and the Open University. He married 1953, Margaret Theophila Radcliffe Tyndale, (born 1925) daughter of Henry Edmund Guise Tyndale, M.B.E. by Ruth Isabel Walcott Radcliffe. The couple had two daughters, Hon. Joanna Ruth Miriam Pease (born 1959) and Hon. Virginia Claire Margaret Pease (born 1960). He succeeded to the title on his father's death in 1971.

References

1921 births
2013 deaths
People educated at Eton College
People educated at Gordonstoun
Alumni of the Open University
People educated at West Downs School
Joseph
Barons in the Peerage of the United Kingdom
Conservative Party (UK) hereditary peers

Gainford